Walter Kershaw (born 7 December 1940) is an English artist in oils and watercolours who is best known for his large scale, external, mural paintings in Northern England and the Americas.

Biography
 

Kershaw is the only son of Florence Kershaw (née Ward) (1916–2010), a retired school caterer; and Walter Kershaw (1917–1998), who served in the Royal Air Force (1936–1946) at Duxford, achieving the rank of Flight Sergeant. He has two younger sisters. Kershaw attended De La Salle College, Salford from 1951 to 1958; and was later a student under the tutelage of Victor Pasmore, Richard Hamilton and Lawrence Gowing at King's College, Durham University (now part of Newcastle University) from 1958 to 1962, graduating with a BA Honours in Fine Art. Kershaw has been twice married and divorced but now is the father of twins (one son and one daughter) with Gillian Halliwell.

After graduating Kershaw taught at Bury Arts and Crafts Centre but has always primarily been self-employed and continued to work from his studio in Littleborough until his incarceration in 2021. His early large external murals painted on slum properties alongside his provocative public sculptures attracted much media attention throughout the ‘70s and early ‘80s. He was featured in interviews with Melvyn Bragg,  Anna Ford (for Granada TV); Sue MacGregor (on BBC Radio 4); as a guest of Janet Street-Porter (on London Weekend Television); and also alongside Eric Morecambe on Russell Harty’s BBC Two chat show.

George Best was a good friend of Kershaw's and purchased six large drawings and oil paintings from the artist. He also found support in Bob Monkhouse who not only purchased his paintings but also corresponded with him and promoted Kershaw's work on his BBC Radio 2 show.

Ian Potts of the BBC, then a student at the Polytechnic of Central London made a film about Kershaw's work called The First Graffiti Artist. It went on to win the best student film award at the Cannes Film Festival.

Kershaw's work can be found in public collections worldwide including Bury Art Museum, Salford Museum and Art Gallery, the Victoria and Albert Museum, the Arts Council, the Calouste Gulbenkian Foundation and the National Collection of Brazilian Art in São Paulo.

Controversies and incarceration 

In March 2013, Kershaw at the age of 72, pleaded guilty to assaulting an acquaintance the previous year and was fined and given a 12-month conditional discharge.

Kershaw was also the subject of two year restraining order in December 2013. Since 2009 he had received a number of warnings from the police for harassment of Catherine Mitchell, a former life model, with whom he had a brief relationship in 2006.

In 2015 after repeated warnings, Kershaw was banned for life from contacting Miss Mitchell under the terms of another restraining order, but he continued to accost Miss Mitchell in the years that followed, and appeared before the courts repeatedly for breaching the order. In 2021 he was finally imprisioned for a term of four years.

Selected exhibitions and critical reception 

Major group and solo shows include Bear Lane Gallery, Oxford (1962); Salford Art Gallery (1969); House of Commons (1972); and "Lancashire South of the Sands", which toured from the County and Regimental Museum, Preston (1988)

1964: Avgarde Gallery, Manchester. First solo show. Review by Robert Waterhouse in The Guardian

1969: Salford Art Gallery. Review by Merete Bates in The Guardian

1971: North-West Gallery Art Service (touring). Review by Merete Bates in The Guardian

1972: Salford Art Gallery. Review by Merete Bates in The Guardian

1990: Salford Art Gallery. "From Rochdale to Rio". Review by Robert Clark in The Guardian

Selected works

Paintings

Kershaw has travelled extensively and his work (drawings, watercolours, oil paintings and some photos) can be put into series; for example:
 1964 to present day: The Algarve
 1974: San Francisco / Oakland
 1987–1994: Argentina, Ecuador, Paraguay and Peru
 1993: Pacific Islands
Other works include:

Murals
Murals and street art are the medium Kershaw is best known for. Many were painted onto gable-ends of Victorian terraces in the Greater Manchester region and almost all of the early examples have now been demolished or lost through redevelopment. Kershaw always accepted the ephemeral nature of these pieces and often deliberately selected condemned properties as the canvas of his choice. In addition to the giant murals he also painted a number of neglected bridges in the Burnley, Bury and Rochdale areas which led to cease and desist type letters from the local authorities who were more concerned with ongoing costs to maintain such bold colour schemes as opposed to the aesthetic. Kershaw often painted these very early on Sunday mornings when few witnesses were around and these are now considered an early example of guerrilla art.

Sculpture 
In 1970 Kershaw was commissioned to design both the front and rear doors for a new Roman Catholic church in Longsight, Manchester. Cast in aluminium, they depicted the creation of the Universe and the Apocalypse. The doors were complemented by a stained glass window by fellow Rochdale artist Chris Burnett. Located at the intersection of Hamilton Road and Montgomery Road, the church of Saint Robert of Newminster was demolished in 2004.

Other pieces include:
 c.1964: Etruscan Warrior
 c.1967: Fantasy
 c.1968: Aurora (Glass-fibre resin)
 c.1969: West Pennine Woman (fibreglass)
 c.1969: Bodyrock (fibreglass)
 c.1969: Incandescent (cardboard and fibreglass)
 c.1970: Prime Cuts (fibreglass)

Appearances

Television and film 

1974: (11 October) Featured in a segment by Martin Young for Nationwide, BBC One 
 1976: Terra Firma series on BBC Two. Half-hour documentary commissioned by BBC Two for Kershaw to paint a mural on a gable end in Deeplish, Rochdale
 1976: The First Graffiti Artist. Half-hour documentary with fantasy interludes, on Kershaw's early murals. Produced and directed by Ian Potts, at that time a film student at the Polytechnic of Central London. Ian Potts now works in the Historical Film Department at the BBC in London. The film won best student film category at the Cannes Film Festival, (available from NW Film Archives in Manchester). Youtube
 Mid 70's: Guest appearance for Janet Street Porter when she was a presenter for LWT
 1982: (19 October) Interviewed by Martin Henfield for BBC's regional Look North West programme
 1982: (4 November) Guest appearance on Russell Harty's BBC Two chat show alongside Eric Morecambe
 1982: (24 November) News report on BBC's Look North West about Kershaw who had been employed by Leigh Council to teach unemployed youngsters how to paint murals
 1983: (20 April) News report on BBC's Look North West about Kershaw's mural at the Avro / BAe factory in Chadderton
 1983: Featured on Rede Globo (Brazilian National TV)
 1985: Film by Carlyle Video London shown on West German TV
 1987: (12 February) ‘City of Norwich’ murals; part of the Folio series by Anglia TV, presented by Anne Gregg, directed by Michael Edwardes. Half-hour programme including Walter's assistant Ian Starsmore
 1996: (February): Bosnian National TV as part of the annual Sarajevo Winter Festival
 2013: (12 February) Featured on the BBC's The One Show in a segment with fellow Rochdalian Andy Kershaw

Radio

 1975: (10 October) Contributor on Woman's Hour, BBC Radio 4
 1983: (22 December) Guest on Sue MacGregor's Conversation Piece series for BBC Radio 4
 2012: (13 September) Subject of a radio programme entitled 'Walter Kershaw: The UK's First Graffiti Artist?' on BBC Radio 4

Further reading

Online 

 
 Profile on 'For Walls With Tongues'
 1970: "The Hard Slog" (profile in The Guardian newspaper)
 1979: "Making Walls as Pretty as Pictures" (feature on British mural artists including Kershaw in The Sunday Telegraph)
 1993: "Trains and planes and Denis Law" (profile in The Sunday Telegraph featuring the Trafford Park mural v2)
 2012: "Walter Kershaw: Britain's first graffiti artist" (profile in The Guardian newspaper)

Books 

 Painting the Town by Graham Cooper and Doug Sargent, 1979, Phaidon, 
 L'art public peintures murales contemporaines peintures populaires traditionnelles by Jacques Damas (ed.) and Francoise Chatel, 1982, Atelier D’a-Caen 
 Trades and Industries of Norwich by John Taylor and Joyce Gurney-Read, 1988, Gliddon Books, 
 A Northern School: Lancashire Artists of the Twentieth Century by Peter Davies, 1989, Redcliffe Press Ltd, 
 A Minstrel and the Amazon by John Harwood, 2007, Grafisa Edition – Manaus , 
 Street Art, Fine Art: Dulwich Outdoor Gallery by Ingrid Beazley, 2015, Heni Publishing, 
 For Walls With Tongues: an oral history of street murals 1966–1985  ed. Carol Kenna and Steve Lobb, 2019, Greenwich Mural Workshop,

References

20th-century English painters
English male painters
21st-century English painters
English graffiti artists
Guerilla artists
People from Rochdale
Living people
1940 births
Alumni of Newcastle University
20th-century English male artists
21st-century English male artists